3-Fluoro-α-Pyrrolidinovalerophenone (3F-PVP) is a recreational designer drug from the substituted cathinone family with stimulant effects, which first appeared on the illicit market in around 2018. It is illegal in Finland.

See also 
 2-Me-PVP
 3-Fluoroamphetamine
 3-Fluoromethamphetamine
 3-Fluoroethamphetamine
 3-Fluoromethcathinone
 3-Fluorophenmetrazine
 3F-NEB
 3F-NEH
 3F-PiHP
 4F-PVP
 4Cl-PVP
 4F-PHP

References 

Pyrrolidinophenones
Designer drugs
Serotonin-norepinephrine-dopamine releasing agents